Jill McManus (born July 28, 1940 in Englewood, New Jersey) is an American jazz pianist, composer, teacher, and author.

Her mother was a novelist.

Discography

As leader
Symbols of Hopi (1984), w/ T. Harrell, D. Liebman, M. Johnson, B. Hart

As sideman
With Richard Davis
As One (Muse, 1975)

References

External links
Jill McManus on Jazz.com.

1940 births
Living people
People from Englewood, New Jersey
Muse Records artists
20th-century American pianists
20th-century American women pianists
21st-century American pianists
21st-century American women pianists